4Fun (sometimes also Julia & 4Fun) is a Lithuanian music band. They play a wide range of music styles, including rock, pop rock, and country. The band was created in 2001 and participated in several national and international festivals, including Visaginas Country and the Eurovision Song Contest.

Biography
4Fun had participated in the national selection for the Eurovision three times. After unsuccessful attempts in 2005 and 2006, 4Fun won the national selection with their lyrical ballad Love or Leave and performance involving shadow play in 2007. They outstripped two other superfinalists: Aistė Pilvelytė and Rūta Ščiogolevaitė. 4Fun represented Lithuania in the Eurovision Song Contest 2007 in Helsinki and finished 21st with 28 points, with major votes from Ireland (12 points) and Latvia (10 points). Lead singer Julija Ritčik received a wild card entry directly to the finals of the national selection for Eurovision 2008, but placed only 12th out of 14 contestants.

In 2008, 4Fun together with Latvian Valters & Kaža recorded song With U, which became a hit in Latvia.

Discography 
Gyvas (Alive) – 2004
Dėlionė/A Puzzle – 2009 (a double CD: one in Lithuanian, another in English)

References

External links 
Official site

Eurovision Song Contest entrants for Lithuania
Eurovision Song Contest entrants of 2007
Lithuanian pop music groups